The Beauty Inside is a 2018 South Korean television series based on the 2015 film of the same name; starring Seo Hyun-jin, Lee Min-ki, Lee Da-hee, and Ahn Jae-hyun. It aired on JTBC from October 1 to November 20, 2018.

Synopsis
About the love story of Han Se-gye (Seo Hyun-jin) who is an A-list actress. She is known as a troublemaker and the object of many rumors. Her life is a mystery, but, in reality, she suffers from an unusual phenomenon. At a certain point every month, her appearance changes to a different person. Seo Do-jae (Lee Min-ki) who is an executive director of an airline company, seems perfect. He is attractive and intelligent but he actually suffers from prosopagnosia. The two eventually fall in love.

Cast

Main
 Seo Hyun-jin as Han Se-gye
A top actress who is the subject of numerous rumors, especially because she occasionally suddenly disappears from public view. Every month she transforms into someone else for a week (e.g., old lady, young boy, Caucasian lady etc.)  Only a few people know her secret and they do their best to cover for her.  She is the model for T Road Airline. She has a connection with Do-jae which she is unaware of.
 Lee Min-ki as Seo Do-jae 
Director of an airline company, T Road Air who has face blindness after his brain was injured in an accident . He hides his disorder from the world, and remembers people's habits and appearance to recognize them. He has a connection with Se-gye which he too is unaware of. 
 Lee Da-hee as Kang Sa-ra
Seo Do-jae's step-sister, who bickers with him to hide her inferiority for not being the biological daughter of Sunho Group. She owns OneAir, Seo Do-jae's rival in business whom aspires to surpass. She eventually falls in love with Ryu Eun-ho.
 Ahn Jae-hyun as Ryu Eun-ho
A prospective priest known for his peaceful and calm nature. He protects Han Se-gye's secret as her close friend. Love interest of Sa-ra. He changes his dream because of Sa-ra.

Supporting

People around Han Se-gye
 Moon Ji-in as Yoo Woo-mi 
Han Se-gye's manager and close friend who also knows her secret.
 Kim Hee-jung as Han Sook-hee
Han Se-gye's mother. 
 Ryu Hwa-young as Chae Yoo-ri 
An actress who is Han Se-gye's rival and tries her best to bring Se-gye down.

People around Seo Do-jae
 Lee Tae-ri as Jung Joo-hwan 
Seo Do-jae's secretary. He is sarcastic and straightforward, but is unwaveringly loyal to Seo Do-jae. He is one of the few people who know about Seo Do-jae's illness.
 Na Young-hee as Im Jung-yeon 
Seo Do-jae's mother and Kang Sa-ra's stepmother.
 Lee Moon-soo as CEO Im
Seo Do-jae's grandfather and Im Jung-yeon's father.He thinks Do-jae is incompetent and incapable unaware of his illness.

People around Ryu Eun-ho
 Lee Han-wi as Ryu Eun-ho's father 
 Kim Ye-ryeong as Ryu Eun-ho's mother 
She is strongly against Eun-ho becoming a priest but eventually accepts. 
 Oh Yoo-jin as Ryu Ah-ram, Ryu Eun-ho's younger sister.

Others
 Kang Nam-gil as Kang Dae-sik 
A professor who is married with Im Jung-yeon. Kang Sa-ra's father.
 Lee Jung-hyuk as Yoon-ha	
 Lee Ga-ryeong as Actress
 Moon Sook as Woo-jin's mother
 Kim Seung-wook as Lee Hee-sub
 Lee Cheol-min as Director Kim
 Kang In-seo
 Oh Se-young as Joo Ga-young

Special appearances
 Kang So-ra as herself (Ep. 1)
 Ye Ji-won as herself (Ep. 1)
 Lee Jae-yoon as himself (Ep. 1, 4)
 Ha Si-eun as herself (Ep. 1)
 Kim Jun-hyun as Han Se-gye (Ep. 1)
 Son Sook as Han Se-gye (ep 1)
 Kim Ki-doo as Doctor (Ep. 1)
 Choi Dae-chul as Donor (Ep. 1)
 Kim Sung-ryung as Han Se-gye (Ep. 1, 2)
 Ko Kyu-pil as Han Se-gye (Ep. 1, 2)
 Kim Min-seok as Han Se-gye (Ep. 5, 6)
 Moon Woo-jin as Han Se-gye (Ep. 8, 9)
 Ra Mi-ran as Han Se-gye (Ep. 10)
 Hur Youngji as Han Se-gye's fan (Ep. 13)
 Jeon Hye-bin as Han Se-gye (Ep. 16)

Production
First script reading took place on July 22, 2018.

Original soundtrack

Part 1

Part 2

Part 3

Part 4

Part 5

Part 6

Part 7

Viewership

Awards and nominations

International broadcast
 - The Beauty Inside was aired on TV5 on Mondays to Fridays at 22:30 (PST) from February 1, 2021 to April 30, 2021.

References

External links
  
 
 

Korean-language television shows
JTBC television dramas
2018 South Korean television series debuts
2018 South Korean television series endings
South Korean fantasy television series
South Korean romance television series
South Korean melodrama television series
Television series by Next Entertainment World